Marta Zofia Kwiatkowska  is a Polish theoretical computer scientist based in the United Kingdom.

Kwiatkowska is Professor of Computing Systems in the Department of Computer Science at the University of Oxford, England, and  a Fellow of Trinity College, Oxford. Her research focuses on developing modelling and automated verification techniques for computing systems in order to guarantee safe, secure, reliable, timely and resource-efficient operation.

Education
Kwiatkowska received her Bachelor of Science and Master of Science degrees in Computer Science with distinction summa cum laude from Jagiellonian University in Krakow, Poland. She obtained her PhD in Computer Science from the University of Leicester in 1989.

Career and research
After obtaining her PhD, Kwiatkowska was assistant professor at Jagiellonian University, Krakow, Poland (1980–1988); research scholar and lecturer in Computer Science at University of Leicester (1984–1994); and lecturer in Computer Science, reader in Semantics for Concurrency, and professor of Computer Science at University of Birmingham (1984–2007). Joining the University of Oxford in 2007, Kwiatkowska was the first female professor in the Department of Computer Science and now heads the Automated Verification research theme.

Kwiatkowska’s research develops models and analysis methods for complex systems, as found in computer networks, biological organisms and electronic devices. Kwiatkowska led development of the PRISM probabilistic model checker; PRISM has been downloaded over 79,000 times and there are over 400 papers by external research teams using PRISM (as at January 2021).

Instrumental in the development of probabilistic and quantitative methods in verification on the international scene, Kwiatkowska’s recent work incorporates synthesis from quantitative specifications with a focus on safety and robustness for machine learning and AI. A member of the Global Partnership on Artificial Intelligence (GPAI) 'Responsible AI Working Group', and the Royal Society's 'Digital Technology and the Planet Working Group', Kwiatkowska advocates responsible adoption of trustworthy AI.

As a senior member of OxWoCS, contributor to the Perspektywy Women in Tech Summit and adviser to the Suffrage Science Award (2016), Kwiatkowska encourages women to pursue careers in science.

Kwiatkowska serves on the editorial boards of Information and Computation, Formal Methods in System Design, Logical Methods in Computer Science, Science of Computer Programming and the Royal Society's Open Science.

Current projects

 FUN2MODEL: From FUNction-based TO MOdel-based automated probabilistic reasoning for DEep Learning (2019-2024), a European Research Council (ERC) Advanced Grant.
Mobile Autonomy: Enabling a Pervasive Technology of the Future (2015–2021), an Engineering and Physical Sciences Research Council (EPSRC) Programme Grant (co-I).

Selected talks and lectures

'Probabilistic Model Checking for the Data-Rich World' BCS 2020 Lovelace Lecture, on-line event, May 2021.
'Probabilistic Model Checking for Strategic Equilibria-Based Decision Making' Conference on Principles of Knowledge Representation and Reasoning, (KR 2020), on-line event, September 2020. '
'When to Trust a Self-Driving Car...' - Milner Award Prize Lecture, November 2018.
'When to trust a robot' – Hay Festival talk on 30 May 2017.
 'Model Checking and Strategy Synthesis for Stochastic Games: From Theory to Practice' – invited lecture at Simons Institute for the Theory of Computing, UC Berkeley, October 2016.
 'Mobile Autonomous Robots' – invited lecture at IntelliSys, September 2016.

Awards and honours 

 Fellow of the European Laboratory for Learning and Intelligent Systems (ELLIS Society), 2020.
 Awarded the BCS Ada Lovelace Medal for 'her research in probabilistic and quantitative verification. Since 2001 she has led the development of the highly influential probabilistic model checker PRISM', 2019.
 Fellow of the Royal Society, (FRS), 2019.
 Became the first female winner of the Royal Society Milner Award in recognition of ‘her contribution to the theoretical and practical development of stochastic and quantitative model checking’, 2018.
 Jointly awarded the HVC 2016 Award for her ‘contributions to probabilistic model checking and, more generally, to formal verification’, 2016.

Kwiatkowska was awarded an Honorary Doctorate at the KTH Royal Institute of Technology in 2014, and is Fellow of ACM, Fellow of EATCS, Fellow of the BCS, a member of Academia Europaea, and Fellow of Polish Society of Arts & Sciences Abroad.

Personal life

Kwiatkowska lives in Oxford with her husband, with whom she has a daughter.

References

External links
 Kwiatkowska's University of Oxford homepage
 Kwiatkowska's Trinity College homepage

Living people
Jagiellonian University alumni
Academic staff of Jagiellonian University
Academics of the University of Leicester
Academics of the University of Birmingham
Members of the Department of Computer Science, University of Oxford
Members of Academia Europaea
Fellows of Trinity College, Oxford
Polish computer scientists
British computer scientists
British women computer scientists
British people of Polish descent
Formal methods people
Women logicians
Polish women computer scientists
Polish women academics
Fellows of the Association for Computing Machinery
Fellows of the Royal Society
1957 births
Female Fellows of the Royal Society